Pseudalus leos is a moth in the subfamily Arctiinae. It was described by Herbert Druce in 1898. It is found in Ecuador and Peru.

Subspecies
Pseudalus leos leos (Ecuador)
Pseudalus leos occidentalis Rothschild, 1909 (Peru)

References

Moths described in 1898
Arctiini